David Zwirner Gallery is an American contemporary art gallery owned by David Zwirner. It has four gallery spaces in New York City and one each in London, Hong Kong, and Paris.

History 

The Zwirner Gallery opened in 1993 on the ground floor of 43 Greene Street in SoHo in New York City, with a one-man show of the Austrian sculptor Franz West.

In 2002 it moved to 525 West 19th Street in the Chelsea neighborhood of New York. In 2012 it opened a  London branch in Grafton Street, in Mayfair, and built a large new space, designed by Annabelle Selldorf, at 537 West 20th Street, Chelsea, New York.

In September 2017 it opened an Upper East Side space in a 1907 townhouse off Madison Avenue, re-designed by Selldorf. A  space at the H Queen's building in Hong Kong was also designed by Selldorf.

In 2019 the gallery opened an  outpost in the Marais district of Paris, its first in continental Europe.

According to The New York Times in 2018, the gallery reports annual revenue of 500 million dollars. Given the overall size of its operations, it is often compared to Gagosian Gallery and Hauser & Wirth.

Artists

References

1993 establishments in New York City
Culture of New York City
Art museums and galleries in Manhattan
Art galleries established in 1993
Contemporary art galleries in London
Zwirner family